Edgewood Independent School District is a public school district based in San Antonio, in Bexar County, Texas (USA).

History
The Edgewood district is most notable as the original plaintiff in a Texas court case which led to the "Robin Hood" school finance plan (which was itself later ruled unconstitutional). The district has sued the state government regarding its school financing since 1984.

In 2009, the school district was rated "academically acceptable" by the Texas Education Agency.

As of the 2012-2013 school year the district had a school attendance rate of 93.9%, the lowest such rate of all of the San Antonio-area school districts. Joshua Fechter of the San Antonio Express-News stated "Comparatively speaking" that this rate "does not differ much from other area districts whose rates hovers between 94-98 percent."

In 2015 multiple administrators either resigned or learned that their contracts would not be renewed.

Circa 2016 the elected board could not agree on who should be superintendent nor who should be the principals of the district's high schools. The Texas Education Agency replaced the elected school board with its own managers around that time. Circa 2019 the agency was planning to allow a new elected board to take control. In 2019 it announced that it would take control of the district, vacating the elected board.

Geography
As of 2015 the school district is "property poor" which means the areas within the district are low income and generate relatively little property tax.

Schools

High schools (Grades 9-12)

Memorial High School
 Mascot: Mighty Minutemen
 Colors: Red, White and Blue
John F. Kennedy High School
 Mascot: Rocket
 Colors: Green, Silver, and Black

Middle schools (Grades 6-8)
Brentwood Middle
Brentwood Middle School is a 6-8 public school located in the Thompson Field area of San Antonio, TX.  The school was opened in 1965 adjacent to Kennedy High School.  The school's mascot is the Viking and its colors are black and gold.
Gus Garcia Middle 
Harry S. Truman Middle
Harry S. Truman Middle is a 6-8 public school. This school is adjacent to Memorial High School. The school's mascot is the Eagle and its colors are blue and white.
E.T. Wrenn Middle
Wrenn middle school's mascot is the mighty hornet and its colors are green and black

Elementary schools (Grades PK-5)
Burleson Early Childhood (PK/Headstart)
Cardenas Early Childhood (PK/Headstart)
Cisneros Elementary
Coronado/Escobar Elementary
Gardendale Elementary
H.B. Gonzalez Elementary
Regina Hoelscher Elementary
Hoelscher Elementary opened in 1961 in the Thompson Field area of San Antonio, TX, adjacent to Brentwood Middle School.  At the time of the school's closure it was a K-5 facility.  The school closed in the spring of 2005 due to high maintenance costs and declining enrollment in Edgewood.  The school's mascot was the Little Rockets and its colors were green and white.
Las Palmas Elementary
Lyndon B. Johnson Elementary
Loma Park Elementary
Alonso S. Perales Elementary
Roosevelt Elementary
Stafford Early Childhood (PK/Headstart)
Stafford Elementary
Norman Winston Elementary
Winston Elementary is a K-5 school located in the Thompson Field area of San Antonio, TX.  The school opened in 1952 at what was then the southern tip of Edgewood right at the entrance to what was then Kelly Air Force Base.  Due to the school's proximity to housing facilities for airmen stationed at Lackland Air Force Base the school enrolls a higher percentage of children from military families than other Edgewood schools.  Gloria Estefan attended the school in 1963-64.  All of the school's students feed into Brentwood Middle School.  The school's mascot is the Eagle and its colors are cyan and yellow.

Sub campus for high schools
Edgewood Fine Arts Academy (Grades 9-12)

Edge News
Edge News (formally "Edgewood On The Air") is the Edgewood Independent School District Local TV show which is broadcast on Time Warner Cable Ch. 98 On Saturdays and Sundays @ 4:30PM. The show started in the Fall of 2006. The show is taped monthly at the Edgewood Fine Arts Academy Studio and is under the direction of Edgewood Public Relations Director Mr. Mario Rios.

References

External links

School districts in Bexar County, Texas
School districts in San Antonio